The 2002 NCAA Division I Women's Tennis Championships were the 21st annual championships to determine the national champions of NCAA Division I women's singles, doubles, and team collegiate tennis in the United States.

Defending champions and hosts Stanford defeated Florida in the team final, 4–1, to claim their twelfth national title (and fourth in six years).

Host
This year's tournaments were hosted by Stanford University at the Taube Tennis Center in Stanford, California.

The men's and women's NCAA tennis championships would not be held jointly until 2006.

See also
NCAA Division II Tennis Championships (Men, Women)
NCAA Division III Tennis Championships (Men, Women)

References

External links
List of NCAA Women's Tennis Champions

NCAA Division I tennis championships
NCAA Division I Tennis Championships
NCAA Division I Tennis Championships
NCAA Division I Women's Tennis Championships